KillRoy Was Here is a 2022 American comedy horror anthology film directed by Kevin Smith and written by Smith and Andrew McElfresh. The film stars Azita Ghanizada, Ryan O'Nan, Harley Quinn Smith, Chris Jericho, Justin Kucsulain, Jason Mewes, and Ralph Garman.

The film was released as 5,555 exclusive non-fungible tokens on July 12, 2022, on Legendao, Secret Network's NFT minting platform. It is the first feature film to be released as an NFT.

Premise
The film is a comedy horror anthology centred around the phenomenon of the "Kilroy was here" graffiti.

Cast

Production

Development
In April 2014, Kevin Smith announced the Christmas-themed horror movie Anti-Claus, with a script based on the episode The Christmas Special of his Edumacation podcast. The script was co-written by his Edumacation co-host Andrew McElfresh, marking it the first script Smith collaborated on with another writer. Filming was initially scheduled for September 2014, with Tusk (2014) actors Justin Long, Michael Parks, and Haley Joel Osment returning as cast. The movie centered around the European folklore figure Krampus, a devil-esque creature who punishes naughty children.

The film is a horror anthology based on the graffiti phenomenon that Smith directed, based on a script co-written by him and Andrew McElfresh, marking the first time he shares writing credit on one of his movies. The script is a retooling of their Anti-Claus movie, which was initially cancelled after the release of Krampus (2015) due to the similar story.

Filming
Principal photography began on June 15, 2017, in Sarasota, Florida, with Brandon D. Hyde serving as cinematographer. The film also shot scenes in areas around Ringling College of Art and Design and Nathan Benderson Park, before moving to Longboat Key. In January 2018, Azita Ghanizada, Ryan O'Nan, Justin Kucsulain, Kathryn Parks, Brendan Ragen, Michael Perez, and Cindy De La Cruz were confirmed to be starring in the film, while Andrew McElfresh, Tony Stopperan, Joe Restaino, Nick Morgulis, Jordan Monsanto, and Adam Yeremian signed on as producers. In the same month, Smith's daughter, Harley Quinn Smith, joined the cast. In August 2018, Chris Jericho was confirmed to star in the film, before filming wrapped in October 2018.

Post-production
In April 2020, Smith revealed that the tone and style of KillRoy Was Here were inspired by Creepshow (1982), another comedy horror anthology film. Robert Kurtzman designed the titular character, describing it as a "long-nosed monster". Simon Taufique was revealed to have composed the score for the film. By April 2022, Jason Mewes and Ralph Garman were confirmed to appear in the film.

Release
KillRoy Was Here was released via NFT minting platform Legendao as 5,555 exclusive tokens on July 12, 2022. In February 2020, before the COVID-19 lockdowns, the film was set for a 2020 theatrical release. In July 2020, during San Diego Comic-Con@Home, Smith indicated that the theatrical release had been pushed back to 2021. In April 2021, it was announced that the film would be released exclusively as a non-fungible token (NFT). The film's distribution rights were set to be auctioned off in May 2022 at Jay and Silent Bob's Crypto Studio. The film was publicly screened in full for the first time on November 30, 2022 at Smodcastle Cinemas in Atlantic Highlands, NJ. The screening concluded night one of the 1st annual Smodcastle Film Festival.

References

External links

2022 comedy horror films
2022 films
American comedy horror films
American horror anthology films
Crime horror films
Films directed by Kevin Smith
Films shot in Florida
Films with screenplays by Kevin Smith
SModcast Pictures films
View Askew Productions films
2020s English-language films
2020s American films